Muljadi (formerly known as Ang Tjin Siang 翁振祥) was a world class badminton player who represented Indonesia between 1963 and 1973.

Career
Muljadi's career spanned two separate eras of Indonesian domination of the then triennial Thomas Cup (men's international team) competition: 1958 to 1964 and 1970 to 1979. Though he occasionally dropped matches in earlier Thomas Cup rounds, he was undefeated in singles (6-0) in four consecutive final round showdowns (1964, 1967, 1970, 1973), a record unmatched by better known teammates such as Ferry Sonneville, Tan Joe Hok, and Rudy Hartono. He won several Indonesian national singles titles during the 1960s as well as the French Open (1966), the Asian Championships (1969), and individual honors in the Asian Games (1966). He was runnerup to Hartono at the prestigious All-England Championships in 1971 but defeated Hartono to win the U.S. Open title that year. Muljadi died on 14 March 2010.

Achievements

Asian Games 
Men's singles

Men's doubles

Asian Championships 
Men's singles

International Tournaments 

Men's singles

Men's doubles

References 

Indonesian male badminton players
2010 deaths
Asian Games medalists in badminton
Badminton players at the 1966 Asian Games
Badminton players at the 1970 Asian Games
Asian Games gold medalists for Indonesia
Asian Games silver medalists for Indonesia
Medalists at the 1966 Asian Games
Medalists at the 1970 Asian Games
Indonesian people of Chinese descent
1942 births
People from Jember Regency
Sportspeople from East Java